Hassan Muhammad Gusau, (born 12 December 1960) known as Hassan Nasiha, is a Nigerian politician who is the current deputy governor of Zamfara State, taking office in 2022 following the impeachment of Mahdi Aliyu Gusau. He was appointed deputy governor by Governor Bello Matawalle after Mahdi Aliyu Gusau was impeached by the Zamfara State House of Assembly on 23 February 2022. He is a member of the All Progressive Congress  (APC). He defected from PDP to APC along side the state governor Bello Matawalle and other diplomats. He was the serving senator since 2019 for Zamfara Central in the 9th National Assembly before his appointment as deputy governor. He previously served in this position from 2007 to 2011 losing reelection in 2011 to Kabir Garba Marafa.

Education 
Gusau obtained a Diploma in Nursing & Midwifery. He held appointments as Commissioner for Health, Commerce, Environment, Water Resources, Land & Housing, local government and chieftaincy affairs of Zamfara State (1999–2007).

After being elected to the Senate 2007 in the 6th National Assembly, he was appointed to committees on Science & Technology, Public Accounts, Marine Transport, Health, Gas and Employment, Labour & Productivity. And in The 9th National Assembly 2019 he is the Chairman Senate committee on Ecology and climate change.

References

Living people
1960 births
Zamfara State
Members of the Senate (Nigeria)
Peoples Democratic Party (Nigeria) politicians
21st-century Nigerian politicians